Yatchenko is a Ukrainian surname. Notable people with the surname include:

 Dmitri Yatchenko (born 1986), Russian footballer
 Iryna Yatchenko (born 1965), Belarusian discus thrower
 Yevgeni Yatchenko (born 1986), Russian footballer

Russian-language surnames